Operation New Dawn may refer to:

 Operation New Dawn (Iraq, 2010–2011), the United States Armed Forces' involvement in the Iraq War after August 2010
 Operation New Dawn (Afghanistan), an operation in Trekh Nawa in the summer of 2010
Second Battle of Fallujah, also known as Operation Al-Fajr (The Dawn), a 2004 joint U.S.-Iraqi offensive against the insurgent stronghold of Fallujah during the Iraq War

See also
New Dawn (disambiguation)
Operation Dawn (disambiguation)